is a railway station on the Rokko Island Line in Kobe, Hyōgo Prefecture, Japan, operated by Kobe New Transit. It is the final stop for southbound trains originating at Sumiyoshi Station.

Lines
Marine Park Station is served by the Rokko Island Line automated guideway transit, and is located 4.5 kilometers from the terminus of the line at Sumiyoshi Station.

Station layout
Marine Park Station has a single island platform.

Platforms

Adjacent stations

History
Marine Park Station opened on February 21, 1990.

Surrounding area 
The station is located directly next to Dekapatosu Water Park and Rokko Island High School. It is also walking distance from Canadian Academy. The previous station on the Rokkoliner, Island Center Station, is 500 meters to the north of the station.

Railway stations in Kobe
Railway stations in Japan opened in 1990